The 2015 Electra Israel Open was a professional tennis tournament played on hard courts. It was the 4th edition of the tournament, which was part of the 2015 ATP Challenger Tour. This marked the return of the tournament, which was last held in 2010. It took place in Ra'anana, Israel between 31 March and 5 April.

Singles main-draw entrants

Seeds

 1 Rankings are as of March 23, 2015

Other entrants
The following players received wildcards into the singles main draw:
  Bar Tzuf Botzer
  Amir Weintraub
  Laslo Đere
  Tal Goldengoren

The following players received entry from the qualifying draw:
  Iñigo Cervantes
  Andrea Arnaboldi
  Matteo Viola
  Karen Khachanov

Champions

Singles

 Nikoloz Basilashvili def.  Lukáš Lacko, 4–6, 6–4, 6–3

Doubles

 Mate Pavić /  Michael Venus def.  Rameez Junaid /  Adil Shamasdin, 6–1, 6–4

References
 Combined Main Draw

External links
Official Website

Electra Israel Open
Israel Open
2015 in Israeli sport